Liuzhoudonglu station, is a station of Line 3 of the Nanjing Metro. It started operations on 1 April 2015.

References

Railway stations in Jiangsu
Railway stations in China opened in 2015
Nanjing Metro stations